Lyle Tayo (born Lyle Minnie Shipman; January 19, 1889 – May 2, 1971), aka Lyle Barton, was an American film actress who appeared in more than 50 films between 1921 and 1948, appearing in many short comedies at the Hal Roach Studios, several in support of Laurel and Hardy. Born in Elmdale, Kansas, she and her elder sister, Birleen (or Birdeen), were raised in Kansas City, Missouri. Tayo died in 1971, aged 82, and is interred in Valhalla Memorial Park Cemetery.

Filmography

External links

1889 births
1971 deaths
Actresses from Kansas City, Missouri
American film actresses
American silent film actresses
Burials at Valhalla Memorial Park Cemetery
Hal Roach Studios actors
People from Chase County, Kansas
20th-century American actresses
Our Gang